Rajaton sings ABBA with Lahti Symphony Orchestra is the seventh album of Finnish a cappella ensemble Rajaton, released in 2006. It consists of 13 ABBA covers, ten of which are accompanied by the Lahti Symphony Orchestra and three fully a cappella.

The album reached No. 1 in the Finnish album chart and sold platinum within a month of release.

Track listing

External links
 Official Rajaton website
 Rajaton sings ABBA at Last.fm

2006 albums
Rajaton albums
ABBA tribute albums
A cappella albums